Fonya may refer to:
Fonya, a diminutive of the Russian male first name Agafon
Fonya, a diminutive of the Russian female first name Agafonika